Sara Josefina Sieppi (born 3 June 1991) is a Finnish television host, social media personality and Miss Finland of 2011.

Sara Sieppi, originally from Tornio, Lapland, was the first runner-up in Miss Finland pageant in 2011, but became Miss Finland after Pia Lamberg decided to give up her title. Since then, Sieppi has received a lot of media attention and gained a considerable social media following. Her relationship with TV personality Roope Salminen was widely followed in the Finnish media.

Sieppi has hosted multiple TV shows for Finnish commercial channel Nelonen: Paratiisihotelli Suomi in 2015 and 2017, Ummikot ulkomailla in 2016 and Kiss Bang Love Suomi in 2016. She has also frequently appeared in the Finnish version of Wheel of Fortune on TV5. Sieppi has also been a participant in reality shows, such as Celebrity Big Brother Finland 2013 and Finnish version of the Survivor franchise, Selviytyjät Suomi.

References

Living people
Miss Finland winners
Finnish television presenters
Finnish women television presenters
Finnish beauty pageant winners
1991 births
People from Tornio